Ryse or RYSE or variation, may refer to:

 Ryse: Son of Rome, 2013 videogame from Crytek
 RYSE Hotel, Seoul, South Korea, a hotel in the Autograph Collection
 Ryse Residences, Singapore; a housing development at Pasir Ris
 Refugee Youth Summer Enrichment, a summer program at Harvardvin Boston, part of the Phillips Brooks House Association
 a fictional character from Starship Excelsior, see List of Starship Excelsior episodes

See also

 
 Rice (disambiguation)
 Rise (disambiguation)
 Rize (disambiguation)
 Rhyce Shaw (born 1981), Australian rules football player
 Rhys, a name
 Rhyse (disambiguation)
 Rhyze, a U.S. band
 Ryce, a surname
 Rys (disambiguation)
 Ryze (disambiguation)